Ildar Ildusovich Isangulov (born May 20, 1992) is a Russian former ice hockey defenceman who played for the Salavat Yulaev Ufa of the Kontinental Hockey League (KHL).

Playing career
In November 2011 participated in the Subway Super Series in the Russia men's national junior ice hockey team.

Career statistics

International statistics

Notes

External links

1992 births
Living people
Russian ice hockey defencemen
Salavat Yulaev Ufa players
Tolpar Ufa players
Sportspeople from Ufa